Copenhell is a heavy metal festival held annually at Refshaleøen in Copenhagen, Denmark, since 2010. It was one of the first open-air heavy metal festivals in Denmark.

The festival started in 2010 with two stages, the main stage Helviti and secondary stage Hades. The Upcoming Stage was introduced in 2011 for unsigned bands and was renamed Pandæmonium in 2012.

By year

Copenhell 2010
Copenhell 2010 took place from Friday 11 June to Saturday 12 June.

Line-up:

Copenhell 2011
Copenhell 2011 took place from Friday 17 June to Saturday 18 June.

Line-up:

Copenhell 2012
Copenhell 2012 took place from Friday 15 June to Saturday 16 June including a warmup day on Thursday the 14th. On this day the Danish bands Red Warszawa, Mordax and Svartsot played for the visitors who had tickets that included accommodation (tents).

Line-up:

Copenhell 2013
Copenhell 2013 took place from Friday 14 June to Saturday 15 June, including a warmup day on Thursday 13 June. The Thursday bill this year featured Danish bands Fall of Pantheon, Deus Otiosus, and Hatesphere, as well as the British metalcore band The Defiled, all of whom performed on the Pandæmonium stage.

Line-up:

Copenhell 2014
Copenhell 2014 took place from Wednesday 11 June to Friday 13 June. The days have been changed from the usual Thursday-Saturday dates to accommodate Iron Maiden.

Copenhell 2014 was, for the first time in the festival's history, a full 3-day festival.

Line-up:

Copenhell 2015
Copenhell 2015 took place Thursday 18 June to Saturday 20 June.

Line-up:

Copenhell 2016
Copenhell 2016 took place Thursday 23 June to Saturday 25 June.

Line-up:

Copenhell 2017
Copenhell 2017 took place on Thursday June 22 to Saturday June 24.

Line-up:

Copenhell 2018
Copenhell 2018 took place on Thursday June 21 to Saturday June 23 plus a warmup day on Wednesday June 20.

Line-up:

Warmup day line-up:

Copenhell 2019
Copenhell 2019 took place Wednesday June 19 to Saturday June 22.

Line-up:

Copenhell 2020
Copenhell 2020 was planned to take place Wednesday June 17 to Saturday June 20, but was cancelled on April 7 due to the COVID-19 pandemic.

Copenhell 2021
Copenhell 2021 was planned to take place Wednesday June 16 to Saturday June 19 but was postponed due to the COVID-19 pandemic.

Copenhell 2022
Copenhell 2022 took place Wednesday June 15 to Saturday June 18.

Line-up:

Copenhell 2023
Copenhell 2023 is scheduled for Wednesday June 14 to Saturday June 17.

Lineup:

See also
List of music festivals

References

External links

Official website
High quality photos from many years of Copenhell

Heavy metal festivals in Denmark
Music festivals established in 2010
Music festivals in Denmark
Summer events in Denmark